Kian-e Nesar (also Romanized as Kīān-e Nesār and Kayān-e Nesār; also known as Kīān-e ‘Olyā) is a village in Zagheh Rural District, Zagheh District, Khorramabad County, Lorestan Province, Iran. At the 2006 census, its population was 32, in 6 families.

References 

Towns and villages in Khorramabad County